The 1954 BC Lions season was the inaugural season for the Lions. By Bailey scored the first touchdown in BC Lions history in an 8–6 loss to Winnipeg on August 28, 1954.

The first win in franchise history (and the only win of the season) came on September 18, 1954, when the Lions defeated the Calgary Stampeders 9–4 at Empire Stadium in Vancouver.

The Lions finished the season with a 1–15 record and failed to make the playoffs.

Preseason

Regular season

Season standings

Season schedule

1954 Canadian Football Awards
None

References

BC Lions seasons
BC Lions
1954 Canadian football season by team